Rumeen Farhana  (born 19 August 1981) is a Bangladeshi politician, lawyer and a former member of Member of Bangladesh Legislative Council. She resigned from her latest position on 11 December 2022.

Early life 

Farhana was born in Islampur in Bijoynagar Upazila of Brahmanbaria District. Her father, Oli Ahad is a Bangladeshi politician. After completing secondary school from Holy Cross School and Higher Secondary from Viqarunnisa Noon School and College, she completed her graduation in Law from University of London. Later she obtained Bar-at-Law from Lincoln's Inn of the United Kingdom.

Career 
Farhana is the central international affairs secretary of the Bangladesh Nationalist Party (BNP). As a barrister, she worked in the legal profession of the High Court of Bangladesh. In the Eleventh Jatiya Sangsad election, she represented the BNP as the only female member of parliament of BNP. Due to widespread irregularities in the 2018 Bangladeshi elections, Rumeen was one of only seven members of parliament from BNP, which was the main opposition party of Bangladesh until 2014, and one of two major political parties in the democratic era of Bangladesh from 1991–2014, until persecution of opposition leaders and incarceration of the former Prime Minister Begum Khaleda Zia  seriously debilitated the party.

Farhana is a member of the Dhaka Lawyers Association. She is also known as a Bangladeshi writer and journalist, law and politics.

In 2019, Farhana sought allotment of a 10 katha plot in Dhaka's Purbachal from the government. Any member of the parliament can apply for such an allotment, however her application was leaked from the ministry, which Rumeen speculated was deliberately done by the ministry because of her position as a member of the opposition party.

Bibliography 
 Amader Rojanamacha

External links
 Facebook

References

Living people
1981 births
People from Brahmanbaria district
Bangladesh Nationalist Party politicians
11th Jatiya Sangsad members
Women members of the Jatiya Sangsad
21st-century Bangladeshi women politicians